The 2017–18 Western Kentucky Hilltoppers men's basketball team represented Western Kentucky University during the 2017–18 NCAA Division I men's basketball season. The Hilltoppers were led by head coach Rick Stansbury in his second season and played their home games at E. A. Diddle Arena in Bowling Green, Kentucky as fourth-year members of Conference USA.

On October 16, 2017, assistant coach Ben Hansbrough resigned from WKU following his DUI arrest two days prior.

They finished the season 27–11, 14–4 in C-USA play to finish in third place. They defeated UAB and Old Dominion to advance to the championship game of the C-USA tournament where they lost to Marshall. They received an at-large bid to the National Invitation Tournament where they defeated Boston College, USC, and Oklahoma State to advance to the semifinals where they lost to Utah.

Previous season
The Hilltoppers finished the 2016–17 season with 15–17, 9–9 in C-USA play to finish in a tie for seventh place. They lost to UTSA in the first round of the C-USA tournament.

Offseason

Departures

Incoming transfers

2017 recruiting class
Mitchell Robinson, a McDonald's All-American and a projected first round pick in the 2018 NBA Draft, committed to Western Kentucky a few weeks after the school hired his godfather, Shammond Williams. He signed a National Letter of Intent in November 2016 and enrolled at the school in July 2017. However, later in July, he left the school amid reports that he was unhappy at the school. Head coach Rick Stansbury and the school issued a statement that Robinson was suspended and would not be going on the team's trip to Costa Rica in August. However, asking to be released from his Letter of Intent and being released, he made visits to LSU, Kansas, and New Orleans. At the end of August, he returned to the school and enrolled and stated that he intends to play for Western Kentucky. On September 17, Robinson again left the university announcing he will prepare for the NBA and will not play college basketball.

Costa Rica trip 
The Hilltoppers announced that they would be participating in a seven-day, three-game foreign tour to Costa Rica in August.

Roster

Schedule and results

|-
!colspan=9 style=|Costa Rica trip

|-
!colspan=9 style=| Exhibition

|-
!colspan=9 style=| Non-conference regular season

|-
!colspan=12 style=| Conference USA regular season

|-
!colspan=9 style=| Conference USA Tournament

|-
!colspan=9 style=| NIT

See also
2017–18 WKU Lady Toppers basketball team

References

Western Kentucky Hilltoppers basketball seasons
WKU
WKU
WKU
WKU